Hostage Calm is the second studio album by Connecticut rock band Hostage Calm. It was recorded at Silver Bullet Studios in Burlington, Connecticut and produced by Greg Thomas. This album is the last release to feature drummer Brett Pieper and first to feature guitarist Nick Balzano. On October 12, 2011, a music video was released for the single, "Rebel Fatigues." In December 2011, the band embarked on a UK tour with I Am the Avalanche.

Track listing

Personnel
Hostage Calm
Tom Chiari – lead guitar
Tim Casey – bass, vocals
Chris Martin – lead vocals, guitars, piano
Nick Balzano – guitar, backing vocals
Brett Pieper – drums

Additional personnel
Alan Huck – artwork, layout
Jeff Casazza – artwork, layout
Dave Swanson – engineer
Alan Douches – mastering
Ross Caplet – organ, piano
Greg Thomas – producer, engineer
Greg Moran – vocals (track 10)
Chris Zizzamia – baritone saxophone (track 7)
Ed Goodriend – trombone (track 7)
Hostage Calm – producer, engineer, artwork, layout

References

2010 albums
Hostage Calm albums
Run for Cover Records albums